This is a list of some members of the Knights Templar, a powerful Christian military order during the time of the Crusades. At peak, the Order had approximately 20,000 members.

The Knights Templar were led by the Grand Master, originally based in Jerusalem, whose deputy was the Seneschal. Next in importance was the Marshal, who was responsible for individual commanders, horses, arms and equipment. He usually carried the standard or nominated a standard-bearer. The Commander of the Kingdom of Jerusalem was the treasurer and shared some authority with the Grand Master, balancing his power. Other cities also had Commanders with specific regional responsibilities.

The Grand Master and his Seneschal ruled over eight Templar provincial Masters in Europe, who were responsible for Apulia, Aragon, England, France, Hungary, Poitiers, Portugal and Scotland.

The bulk of the fighting force was made up of knights and sergeants. Knights, who usually came from the nobility, were the most prestigious and wore the white mantle and red cross over their armour, carried knightly weapons, rode horses and had the services of a squire. Sergeants filled other roles such as blacksmith or mason as well as fighting in battle. There were also squires who performed the task of caring for the horses.

Early members

 Hugues de Payens (founder, 1118) (first Grand Master, 1118–1136)
 Godfrey de Saint-Omer (founding member, 1118)
 Payen de Montdidier (founding member, 1118)
 Archambaud de Saint Amand (or Saint Aignan) (founding member, 1118) 
 André de Montbard (founding member, 1118) (later Grand Master, 1153–1156) 
 Gundemar (founding member, 1118), Cistercian Priest and Templar, relative of Bernard of Clairvaux (see Gondomar in portuguese Wiki).
 Rossal/Roral (founding member, 1118), Cistercian Priest and Templar, relative of Bernard of Clairvaux
 Geoffroy Bisol (founding member, 1118)
 Godefroid (founding member, 1118)
 Hugues de Champagne (1125) 
 Fulk V, Count of Anjou, occurs 1119, 1120 or 1121

Aragon

Masters of Aragon
All the dates given are those of the first record as master and of the last. Rarely is the date of appointment or end of tenure known.

The following were de facto provincial masters before the formal creation of an Aragonese province:
 Hugh of Rigaud  (1128–1136)
 Raymond Gaucebert  (1134)
 Arnold of Bedocio  (1136)

The following were "masters in Provence and certain parts of Spain":
 Pere de Rovira  (Pere de la Rovira; November 1143 – January 1158) First Brother to hold the title of Provincial Master
 Hugh of Barcelona  (1159 – April 1162)
 Hugh Geoffrey  (Hugues Godefroi; May 1163 – 1166)
 Arnold of Torroja  (Arnaud de Toroge; October 1166 – March 1181) (afterwards Grand Master 1181–1184)
 Berenguer of Avinyó  (Bérenger d'Avignon; April 1181 – March 1183)
 Guy of Sellón  (April–June 1183)
 Lorencio Plaza;   November 1184)
 Raymond of Canet  (November 1183 – July 1185)
 Gilbert Eral  (Gilbert Erail; October 1185 – August 1189) (afterwards Grand Master 1193–1200)
 Pons (of) Rigaud  (September 1189 – February 1195)
 Gerald of Caercino  (February 1196)
 Arnold of Claramunt  (Arnaud de Clairmont; April – November 1196)
 Pons Marescalci  (Dec. 1196 – June 1199)
 Arnold of Claramunt  (August 1199 – April 1200), second time
 Raymond of Gurb  (Raimon de Gurp; April 1200 – Nov. 1201)
 Pons (of) Rigaud  (April 1202 – July 1206), second time
 Pedro de Monteagudo  (Pierre de Montaigu; July 1207 – June 1212) (later Grand Master, 1218–1232)
 William Cadell  (October 1212 – May 1213)
 William of Montrodón  (January 1214 – September 1218)
 Evelio Ramirez born October 8 death Friday, October 13, 1307, lieutenant, cousin of James 11.
 Adémar de Claret  (1216–1218), lieutenant
 Pons Menescal  (1218–1221), lieutenant
 William of Azylach  (Guillem d'Alliac; February 1221 – July 1223)
 Riperto of Puig Guigone  (January 1224)
 Fulk of Montpesat  (Fulcon de Montpezat; 1224 – Dec. 1227)
 William Cadell  (March 1229 – June 1232), second time
 Raymond Patot  (Raimon Patot; May 1233 – April 1234)
 Hugh of Montlaur  (May 1234 – April 1238)
 Stephen of Belmonte  (June – November 1239)

The following were "masters in Aragon", which also included Catalonia, Roussillon, Navarre, and eventually Majorca, Valencia, and Murcia:
 Raymond of Serra  (May 1240 – June 1243)
 William of Cardona  (January 1244 – May 1252)
 Hugh of Jouy  (September 1254 – June 1247 / March 1258)
 William of Montañana  (May 1258 – February 1262)
 William of Pontóns  (March 1262 – August 1266)
 Arnold of Castellnou  (March 1267 – February 1278)
 Peter of Moncada  (April 1279 – October 1282)
 Berenguer of San Justo  (April 1283 – May 1290)
 Berenguer of Cardona  (June 1291 – January 1307)
 Simon of Lenda  (September 1307)

Note also Peter Peronet, commander of Burriana in 1276.

Source

Czech lands

The Czech lands (or the Lands of the Bohemian Crown) now form the Czech Republic.
 Fridericus de Silvester (1286)
 Berthramus dictus de Czweck (1292), preceptor Niemiec, Sławii i Morawii, w 1294
 Bernhard von Eberstein (1291), w 1295

England

Masters of England
 Fr. William Heath (1153–1156)
 Hugues d'Argentein (1150)
 Hoston de Saint-Omer (1153–1155)
Adam de Somervila (1153)
 Richard de Hastings (1155–1185)
 Geoffroy Fitzstephen (1185–1195)
 Robert de Neuham (1195–1200)
 Thomas Bérard (1200)
 Fr. Alain (1205)
 Guillaume Cadeil (1214)
 Lawrence Ryckman (1216)
 Sir Roger St. Leger (1217)
 Aimery de Sainte-Maure (1215–1219)
 Guillaume de la Gravelle (1220)
 Alain Martel (1220–1228)
 Fr. Aimery (1228)
 Robert de Montfort (1234)
 Robert de Sandford (1235–1241)
 Sir Richard de Argentein (1241–1246)
 Fr. Amblard (1250)
 Roncelin de Fos (1252–1259)
 Robert de Sandford (1259)
 Humbert de Pairaud (1270)
 Gui de Foresta (1275)
 Robert de Torteville (1276)
 Henri de Faverham (1277–1278)
 Robert de Torteville (1280)
 Gui de Foresta (1288)
+Robert de Haleghton (1290–1294 Yorkshire)
 Guillaume de Tourville (1292)
 Gui de Foresta (1293–1296)
 Brian le Jay (1296–1298)
 Guillaume de la More (1298–1307)
 Richard Stronge (1154–1189)

source:

Others
 Robert of St. Albans (d. 1187), converted to Islam and married Saladin's niece, according to Roger of Howden
 Hugh de Paduinan
 Richard Mallebeench, Master of the Templars in England
 Gilbert of Ogerstan, caught stealing money from the Saladin tithe, 1188
 Sir Lachlan MacLean-de Corzon (d.1194) Baron of ak'ham, fought in the Third Crusade
 Sir William de Harcourt, 1216, fought at Siege of Damietta.
 Sir Robert de Sheffield, 1216, fought in the fifth crusade.
 Sir Robert Keyes, 1216, fought in the fifth crusade.
 Sir Allen William Howard of Norfolk (d.1239), fought in the Third Crusade
 Amberaldus, Master of the Templars in England
 Richord Brand, Conqueror of Tyre
 William de Ferrers, 3rd Earl of Derby, fought in the Third Crusade
 Gilbert de Lacy, Precentor of the Templars and a commander in the 1160s
 William Marshal, 1st Earl of Pembroke, invested as a knight on his deathbed
 Elyas de Rolleston, 1270, fought in the Eighth Crusade
 William de Goldingham d.1296 Master Templar, Gislingham,Suffolk. Effigy in All Saints Church, Rushton, Northamptonshire. Fought at the Battle of La Forbie 1244

France

Masters of France
 Marcus Adrienn LeBlanc
 Sir Geoffrey de Charney
 Sir Jean De St. Leger (1096)
 Payen de Montdidier (1130)
 Robert de Craon (died in 1147) (afterwards Grand Master 1136–1147)
 Everard des Barres (1143–1147) (afterwards Grand Master 1147–1151)
 Guillaume Pavet (1160–1161)
 Geoffroy Foucher (1171)
 David de Rancourt (1171–1175)
 Eustache le Chien (1175–1179)
 Robert de Miliaco (1190)
 Raoul de Montliard (1192–1193)
 Gilbert Erail (1196)
 Arn Fredrik LeBlanc (1203)
 André de Coulours (1204)
 Guillaume Oeil-de-Boeuf (1207)
 André de Coulours (1208–1219)
 Guillaume de l'Aigle (1222)
 Fr. Aimard (1222–1223)
 Eudes Royier (1225)
 Olivier de la Roche (1225–1228)
 Pons d'Albon (1229)
 Robert de Lille (1234)
 Pons d'Albon (1236–1240)
 Fr. Damase (lieut.) (1241–1242)
 Renaud de Vichier (1242–1249) (afterwards Grand Master 1250–1256)
 Gui de Basenville (1251–1253)
 Fabienn Deon LeBlanc (1253–1258
 Foulques de Saint-Michel (1256–1258)
 Humbert de Pairaud (1261–1264)
 Amaury de la Roche (1265–1271)
 Jean le François (1277–1281)
 Guillaume de Mallay (1286)
 Hugues de Pairaud (1291–1294)
 Matthew John Norris (1294–1299)
 Gérard de Villiers ( 1299–1307)
 Jerar de Poitous  (1307)
Source:

Les commandeurs de Richerenches

 Arnaud de Bedos (1136–1138)
 Gérard de Montpierre (1138–1139)
 Hugues de Bourbouton (1139–1141)
 Hugues de Panaz (1141–1144)
 Hugues de Bourbouton (1145–1151)
 Déodat de l'Etang (1151–1161)
 Guillaume de Biais (1161)
 Déodat de l'Etang (1162–1173)
 Foulques de Bras (1173–1179)
 Pierre Itier (1179)
 Hugolin (1180–1182)
 Raimond (1200–1203)
 Déodat de Bruissac (1205–1212)
 Lawrence Ryckman (1212-1216)
 Jeremy Bermond (1216–1220)
 David Potterific (1220–1230)
 Bertrand de la Roche (1230)
 Roustan de Comps (1232)
 Raymond Seguis (1244)
 Raymond de Chambarrand (1260–1280)
 Ripert Dupuy (1280–1288)
 Nicholis Laseter (1288–1300)
 Pons d'Alex (1300–1304)
 Raimbaud Alziari (1304)
 Guillaume Hugolin (1308)
 Robert de Sablé Master (1191–1193)

Source:

Les Commandeurs du Ruou
 Hugues Raimond (de Villacros) 1170
 Pons de Rigaud 1180
 Bertrand de Gardannes 1195
 Bertrand Hugues 1195
 Bernard Aimeric (Vice Précepteur) 1203
 Bernard de Claret (Précepteur) 1205
 G. Gralons 1205
 Bernard de Clairet de Claret 1206
 Roger (Vice Précepteur) 1215
 Rostang de Comps 1216
 R. Laugier (Précepteur) 1222
 Rostang de Comps 1224
 R. Laugier (Précepteur) 1229
 Pons Vitrerius 1233
 Rostang de Comps 1235
 Pierre de Boisesono Boysson 1236
 Ugues de Milmeranda 1241
 Rostang de Comps 1248
 Rostang de Boiso ou Buxo de Buis 1251
 Guillaume de Mujoul (Précepteur) 1255
 Alaman 1256
 Rostang de Boiso de Buis 1260
 Boncarus (Précepteur) 1265
 Albert Blacas 1269
 Pierre Geoffroi 1284
 Albert Blacas de Baudinard 1298
 Hugues de Rocafolio 1305
 Bertrand de Silva de la Selve (Précepteur) 1307
 Geoffroy de Pierrevert 1308
 Geoffrey de Campion 1310

Sources:

Visitors of France and Poitou
 Geoffroy Foucher (1164)
 Gauthier de Beyrouth (1166–1168)
 Geoffroy Foucher (1168–1171)
 Eustache le Chien (1171–1173) (afterwards Master of France, 1175)
 Albert de Vaux (1173–1174)
 Baudouin de Gand (1176–1178)
 Aimé de Ayes (1179–1188)
 Eluard de Neuville (1188–1190)
 Gilbert Erail (1190–1193) (afterwards Master of France, 1196)
 Pons Rigaud (1193–1198)
 Aimé de Ayes (1202–1206)
 Pons Rigaud (1207–1208)
 Guillaume Oeil-de-Boeuf (1208–1211) (previously Master of France, 1207)
 Guillaume Cadeil (1212–1216)
 Alain Martel (1221) (also Master of England 1220–1228)
 Hugues de Montilaur (1234–1237)
 Pierre de Saint-Romain (1237–1242)
 Raimbaud de Caromb (1246)
 Renaud de Vichier (1246–1250)
 Hugues de Jouy (1251)
 Constant de Hoverio
 Gui de Basenville (1257–1262)
 Humbert de Pairaud (1266–1269) (afterwards Master of England, 1270)
 Francon de Bort (1270–1273)
 Hugues Raoul (1273)
 Pons de Brozet (1274–1280)
 Geoffroy de Vichier (1286–1290)
 Hugues de Pairaud (1291–1307) (also Master of France, 1291–1294)

Source:

Germany
 Gebhard  Preceptori domorum milicie Templi per Alemanniam  1241, 1244
 Johannes  Magistro summo preceptore milicie Templi per Teutoniam, per Boemiam, per Morauiam et per Poloniam  1251
 Widekind  Domum militie Templi in Alemania et Slauia preceptor Magister domorum militie Templi per Alemaniam et Poloniam  1261, 1268, 1271, 1279
 R de Grae`ubius Preceptor domorum milicie Templi per Alemanniam et Slavia 1280 ?–1284
 Friedrich Wildegraf  Preceptor domorum milicie Templi per Alemanniam et Slauiam  1288–1292
 Bertram gen. Czwek (von Esbeke)  Commendator fratrum domus militie Templi in Almania, Bohemia, Polonia et Moravia  1294–1297
 Friedrich von Alvensleben  Domorum milicie Templi per Alemaniam et Slauiam preceptor  1303–1308
 Hugo de Grumbach Grand master of Germany 1310 ?
 Otto von Brunswick, Comtur of the Order of Knights Templar at Süpplingenburg 1303–1304
 Lord Johan Kraus 1304–1307
 Ruprecht Dilber 1194
 Lieutenants
 Jordanus von Esbeke  domus milicie Templi per Alemaniam et Slauiam vicepreceptor  30 June 1288
 Johan Decher (Decker) 1152–1153

Rhine
 Alban von Randecke  Rhine  1306
 Friedrich Wildegraf  Rhine  1308

Hungary and Croatia

Leaders of Knights Templar in Hungary had official title "masters of Knights Templar for Hungary and Slavonia" (meaning Croatia) (maestro della militia del tempio per Ungariam et Sclavoniam).

Masters of Hungary and Croatia
 Fr. Cuno
 Fr. Gauthier
 Fr. Jean
 Pons de la Croix (1215)
 Johannes Gottfried von Schluck (1230)
 Rembald de Voczon (1241)
 Thierry de Nuss (1247)
 Raimbaud de Caromb
 Jacques de Montreal
 Fr. Widekind (1271–1279)
 Gérard de Villers
 Frédéric wildgrave de Salm (1289)
 Bertram von Esbeke (1296)
 Frédéric de Nigrip
 Frédéric von Alvensleben (1300)

Source:

Slavonia
 brother Dominic (biological brother of Ban Borić)

Italy

Masters of Apulia
 Fr. Boniface (1167)
 Stefan Martello (1177) 
 Guillaume de la Fossa (1186–1188)
 Pons Rigaud (1199–1205)
 Armand de Perigors (1205–1232) (afterwards Grand Master, 1232–1244)
 Jacques de Turisellis
 Lawrence de Ryckman (1245-1248)
 Damase de Fenolar (1255)
 Etienne de Sissey (1264–1271)
 Guillaume de Beaujeu (1273) (afterwards Grand Master, 1273–1291)
 Pierre de Greffier
 Guillaume de Cannelis
 Albert de Cannelis
 Geoffroy de Pierrevert
 Pierre d'Outremont
 Laurent de Beaune (1300)
 Ode de Vaudrie (1307)

Masters of Sicily

 Geoffroy de Champiny (1151)
 Hugues de Rochefort (1197)
 Guillaume d'Orleans (1209) (also Commander of Messina)
 Hermand de Périgord (1229) (at the same time master in Calabria)
 Bonifazio di San Michele (1255) (at the same time master in Calabria)
 Martino Gabillone (1283)
 Guglielmo da Canelli (1284–1287)
 Gerardo de Finoleriis (1304)
 Albert da Canelli (1304–1307)

Masters Centre/North

 Alberico (1190)
 Fr. Gaimardo (1191) (Marches and Lombardy)
 Aimerico de Saliis (1203)
 Aimerico (1205)
 Giovanni Lombardo (1222) (Rome, Tuscany Sardinia and Lombardy)
 Guglielmo da Melzo (1227) (Italy and Lombardy – probably vacancy of the seat Lomb
 Fr. Gerardo (1231)
 Enrico Teutonico (1239–1242)
 Goffredo Lupi di Soragna (1244)
 Giacomo de Boscho (1245)
 Dalmazio de Fenolar (1254- 1256)
 Pietro Fernandi (1259–1260)
 Ermanno di Osimo (1266)
 Enrico da Treviso (1268–1271)
 Bianco da Pigazzano (1281) (Italy and Lombardy) (1271) (Lombardy)
 Uguccione da Vercelli (1300)
 Giacomo da Montecucco (1303) (Lombardy, Tuscany, Rome and Sardinia)
 Bonifacio (1167) (Italy / Lombardy)
 Barozzi or Barozio (1200–1204)
 Alberto Lombardo (1236) (Rome, Tuscany and Sardinia)
 Fr. Ermanno (1247) ( Campania and Marche) / Giacomo de Balma (Procurator of Lon)
 Guglielmo da Bubbio (1254) (Lombardy) / Gabriele Gambulara (Marche), (1261) (Tuscany)
 Oberto di Calamandrana (before 1271) (Lombardy)
 Guilluame de Noves (1285) (Lombardy and Tuscany)
 Artusio de Pocapalea (1290)
 Guglielmo di Canellis (1292–1296)
Source:

Poitiers

Masters of Poitiers
 Fr. Falco (1141)
 Guillaume Guidaugier (1141)
 Fr. Hugues (1151)
 P. Levesque (1166)
 Guillaume Pavet (1166–1173)
 Humbert Boutiers (1180)
 Aimery de Sainte-Maury (1189–1190) (later Master of England, 1215)
 Guillaume Arnauld (1201)
 Témeric Boez (1205)
 Guillaume Oeil-de-Boeuf (1207) (also Master of France, 1207)
 Giraud Brochard (1210–1222)
 Gui de Tulle (1222)
 Giraud de Broges (1223–1234)
 Guillaume de Sonnay (1236–1245)
 Foulques de Saint-Michel (1247–1253)
 Hugues Grisard (1254–1258)
 Francon de Bort (1261)
 Gui de Basenville (1262–1264)
 Humbert de Pairaud (1266–1269)
 Jean le François (1269–1276)
 Amblard de Vienne (1278–1288)
 Raymond de Mareuil (lieut.) (1285–1288)
 Pierre de Madic (1288–1290)
 Pierre de Villiers ou Villard (1292–1300)
 Geoffroy de Gonneville (1300–1307)

Source:

The Holy Land
 Guillaume  1130
 André de Montbard  1148, 1151, 1152, 1154
 Guillaume de Guirehia  1163
 Gautier  1170
 Béranger  1174, 1176
 Seiher de Mamedunc, 1174
 Godechaux de Turout, 1174
 Walter du Mesnil, 1174
 Gérard de Ridefort  1183
 Hurson  1187
 Aimon de Ais  1190
 Reric de Cortina  1191 April–July
 Bryony Bonds  1192
 F. Relis : last to hold the title of seneschal

Grand-Commanders
 Odon  1156
 Gilbert Erail 1183 (afterwards Grand Master 1193–1200)
 Jean de Terric 1188
 Gerbert  1190
 William Payne 1194
 Irmengaud  1198
 Barthélemy de Moret  1240
 Pierre de Saint-Romain  1241
 Gilles  1250 (February)
 Étienne d'Outricourt  1250 (May)
 Amaury de la Roche  1262 (May)
 Guillaume de Montignane 1262 (December)
 Simon de La Tour Landry
 G. de Salvaing  1273
 Arnaud de Châteauneuf  1277–1280
 Thibaud Gaudin  (afterwards Grand Master 1291–1292)

Marshals
 Hugues du Quiliou  1153
 Robert Fraisnel  1186–1187
 Jacques de Maillé  1187
 Geoffroy Morin 1188
 Adam Brion  1198
 Guillaume d'Arguillières  1201
 Hugues de Montlaur  1244
 Renaud de Vichiers  1250
 Hugues de Jouy  1252
 Étienne de Sissey  1260
 Guillaume de Molay  1262
 Gimblard de Vienne  1270
 Guy de Foresta (Forest)  1277–1288?
 Geoffroy de Vandac 1289
 Pierre de Severy  1289–1291
 Jacques de Molay 1291–1292
 Baudouin de La Andrin	1292–1294
 Sir Jarim de'Varean   1294?
 Barthélemy de Quincy  1294–1302
 Aimon(Aimé) d'Osiliers 1302–1308; 1316

Poland
 1134–? – Geoffroy from Płock
 1139–1148 – Bernhardt
 ?–1155 – Joseph P Steinmetz
 1155 – ? – Jarosław from Pëck
 1189–? – Thibault from Halych
 ?–1190 – Mieszko
 ?–? – Jan
 ?–1194 – Guillem Ramond
 ?–1198 – Janusz from Kijów (Kyiv, also Kiev)
 1200–1208 – Jan from Potok
 1201–1223 – Mieszko from Lwów
 1229–1251 – Lukasz
 1229–1241 – Mieszko from Lwów
 ?–? – Zbyszko from Kraków
 ?–? – Andrzej from Toruń
 ?–? – Jurand from Płock
 1251–1256 – Janusz
 1258–1259 – Ratka from Wilno
 1261–1263 – Fridericus
 1273–1281 – Mieszko from Wilno
 1284–1290 – Lukasz
 1285–1291 – Bernhard von Eberstein Humilis preceptor domorum milicie Templi per Poloniam, Sclauiam, Novam TerramPreceptori et fratribus militie Templi in partibus Polonie, Pomeranie, Cassubie, Cracouie et Slauie  13 November 1291 – 1295
 1294 – Sanderus
 1296–1303 – Jordanus von Esbeke / preceptor /
 1301–1312 – Jan from Halych
 1303 – brat Fryderyk von Alvensleben
 1305 – Dietrich von Lorenen
 1309–1312 – Janusz from Halych

Source:

Portugal

Masters of Portugal
 Arnaldo da Rocha? (In the 16th, 17th and 18th centuries, some authors and chroniclers of the history of the Portuguese Templar Order and its continuer, the Order of Christ, possibly based on original medieval source material in Braga and Tomar, cite the Portuguese Pedro Arnaldo da Rocha, of Burgundian and French parentage, as having been one of the founding knights of the militia of the Poor Knights of Christ and of the Temple of Solomon in Jerusalem, alongside Gondemare, and then in Portugal)
 Gondamer or Gondemare? (the same authors identify one of the 9 founders of the Knights Templar, the Knight Gondemare, as having Portuguese origin – possibly from medieval Gundemar; also spelled Gundemari or Gondemare, present-day Gondomar, in the County of Portugal))
 King Afonso I of Portugal, Templar Brother (13.03.1129); First King of Portugal (1139–1185)
 Raymond Bernard, known as Raimundo Bernardo in Portugal (1126–1135) Also possibly a provincial master

The following were masters in Portugal:
 Guilherme Ricardo 1124 (1127–1139)
 Hugo Martins (1139)
 Pedro Froilaz? (1139?–1143)
 Hugues de Montoire (1143)
 Pedro Arnaldo (1155–1158)
 Gualdim Pais 1160 (1158–1195)
 Lopo Fernandes
 Fernando Dias (1202)

The following were masters in the Province of León, Castile and Portugal (based in Tomar, also temporarily in Castelo Branco), or the three kingdoms of Spain:
 Gomes Ramires (1210–1212)
 Pedro Álvares de Alvito (1212–1221)
 Pedro Anes (1223–1224)
 Martim Sanches (1224–1229)
 Estêvão Belmonte (1229–1237)
 Guilherme Fulco alias Fouque (1237–1242)
 Martim Martins (1242–1248)
 Pedro Gomes (1248–1251)
 Paio Gomes (1251–1253)
 Martim Nunes (1253–1265)
 Gonçalo Martins (1268–1271)
 Beltrão de Valverde (1273–1277)
 João Escritor (1280–1283)
 João Fernandes (1283–1288)

The following were masters in Portugal:
 Afonso Pais-Gomes (1289–1290)
 Lourenço Martins (1291–1295)
 Vasco Fernandes (1295–1306)

Source:

Prats-de-Mollo
Family dez Coll:
 Berenger de Coll (last known survivor of Mas Deu – 1350)
 Guillem de Cardona (1247–1251)
 Hugues de Jouy (1251)
 S. de Belmonte (1269)
 Pere de Montcada (1276–1282)
 Bérenger de Cardona (1304)
 Rodrigue Ibañez (1307)

See also
 List of Knights Templar sites

References

 
Lists of military personnel
Templar
Lists of medieval people
Templar